Sir John Frederick, 5th Baronet (1750–1825), was a British politician who sat in the House of Commons between 1774 and 1807.

Early life
Frederick was the only surviving son of Sir John Frederick, 4th Baronet of Burwood Park, Surrey and his wife Susanna Hudson. He was born on 18 March 1750, educated at Westminster School from 1760 to 1765 and at Trinity College, Oxford in 1767. From 1769 to 1772 he made the Grand Tour of Europe.

Career
In 1774 Frederick was returned as Member of Parliament for Newport, Cornwall in the interest of Humphry Morice. By 1780 Morice had sold his borough and Frederick was not returned in 1780. He sought another seat and was returned for Christchurch at a by-election in 1781.  On the death of his father on 9 April 1783 he succeeded to the Baronetcy. He was re-elected for Christchurch again in 1784. In 1790 he was elected MP for his home county Surrey and held the seat until 1807.

He served as lieutenant-colonel of the 1st Supplemntary Surrey Militia (later 2nd Royal Surrey Militia from its first raising on 2 January 1797 until his resignation on 26 October 1804. His son Richard was also an officer in the regiment and commanded it in Ireland in 1811–13.

Family

He married Mary Garth, daughter of Richard Garth of Morden, Surrey, on 15 October 1778, and they had six sons and four daughters, including:
 Sir Richard Frederick, 6th Baronet, born 30 December 1780, died 20 September 1873
 Thomas Nathan Frederick, born 11 July 1783, died 1818
 Charlotte Frederick, married Rev R.A. St Leger of Starcross, Devon, and died 1858
 Mary Frederick, married James Chamness Fisher of Twickenham and died 2 April 1823
 Frabcis Frederick, married Henry Fellowes, 2nd son of Robert Fellowes of Shotesham, Norfolk, and died 28 Apil 1874
 
Sir John Frederick died on 16 January 1825 and was buried at Walton-on-Thames where there is unusual pyramid shaped monument to him and his wife.

References

Sources
 Burke's Peerage, Baronetage and Knightage, 100th Edn, London, 1953.
 Capt John Davis, Historical Records of the Second Royal Surrey or Eleventh Regiment of Militia, London: Marcus Ward, 1877.
Kidd, Charles, Williamson, David (editors). Debrett's Peerage and Baronetage (1990 edition). New York: St Martin's Press, 1990.

Walton on Thames St Mary’s Parish Church Monuments

|-

1750 births
1825 deaths
People from Surrey
People educated at Westminster School, London
Alumni of Trinity College, Oxford
Members of the Parliament of Great Britain for English constituencies
British MPs 1774–1780
British MPs 1780–1784
British MPs 1784–1790
British MPs 1768–1774
Baronets in the Baronetage of Great Britain
Surrey Militia officers